is a former Japanese football player.

Club statistics

References

External links

1984 births
Living people
Association football people from Mie Prefecture
People from Matsusaka, Mie
Japanese footballers
J1 League players
J2 League players
Japan Football League players
Singapore Premier League players
Kawasaki Frontale players
Vegalta Sendai players
Albirex Niigata Singapore FC players
Zweigen Kanazawa players
Veertien Mie players
Japanese expatriate footballers
Association football midfielders